Trnovec ( or ) is a dispersed settlement in the hills southwest of Medvode in the Upper Carniola region of Slovenia.

Name
The place name Trnovec (and related names such as Trnovce, Trnovče, Trnovci, and Trnovska vas) is common in Slovenia. It is derived from the common noun trn 'thorn', referring to a place where thorny brush grows.

Gallery

References

External links

Trnovec on Geopedia

Populated places in the Municipality of Medvode